Arsenidogermanates are chemical compounds that contain anions with arsenic bonded to germanium. They are in the category of tetrelarsenides, pnictidogermanates, or tetrelpnictides.

Germanium forms two arsenides: GeAs and GeAs2.

List

References

Arsenides
Germanium compounds